Dorothy Fadiman (born June 3, 1939 in Pennsylvania) is an American documentary filmmaker, director, and producer.

Early life 
Fadiman was raised in Pennsylvania.

Education 
Fadiman attended University of Pittsburgh and Penn State, and received an MA from Stanford University.

Career
Since 1976, Fadiman has been producing documentaries with a focus on social justice and human rights.

Fadiman had an illegal abortion in 1962 after becoming pregnant while at Stanford University. She was blindfolded throughout the procedure, hemorrhaged and ended up on the intensive care ward of Stanford hospital. Fadiman's abortion experience was the catalyst behind making the documentary film: When Abortion Was Illegal: Untold Stories. The film was nominated for an OSCAR in the Best Documentary Short category in 1993.

Filmography
CHEF DARREN: The Challenge of Profound Deafness (2018)
A DARING JOURNEY: From Immigration to Education (2015)
 Butterfly Town, USA (2015)
Shattering the Myth of Aging: Senior Games Celebrate Healthy Lifestyles, Competition and Community  (2010)
Motherhood by Choice, Not Chance (2010)
Reclaiming their Voice: The Native American Vote in New Mexico & Beyond (film) (2009)
Stealing America: Vote by Vote (2008)
Breathe Easy (2007)
Moment by Moment: The Healing Journey of Molly Hale (2005)
Seeds of Hope: HIV/AIDS in Ethiopia (2006)
Woman by Woman: New Hope for the Villages of India (2001)
Fix-It Shops: An Endangered Species (1999)
The Fragile Promise of Choice: Abortion in the United States Today (1996)
From Danger to Dignity: The Fight for Safe Abortion (1995)
When Abortion Was Illegal: Untold Stories (1992)
Why Do These Kids Love School? (1990)
World Peace is A Local Issue (1983) (digitally remastered in 2013 and released in 2014) 
Celebration (1983)
Peace: A Conscious Choice (1982)
RADIANCE: The Experience of Light (1978)

Other Projects
Producing with Passion: Making Films That Change the World (2008) with Tony Levelle, 
Open Secret: The Poetry of Rumi (1989 and 1993) with Coleman Barks

Awards
OSCAR nomination, Best Documentary Short. (1992)
Emmy Award (1996)
Gold Medal, Corporation for Public Broadcasting
BEST DOCUMENTARY, Atlanta International Film/Video Festival
Critics Choice Award, Broadcast Film Critics
"FREDDIE," The International Medical Media Award
Gold Hugo, The Chicago International Film Festival
BEST TELEVISION DOCUMENTARY, The EMMA, Exceptional Merit Media Award, National Women's Political Caucus
Gold Apple, National Educational Media Festival
BRONZE CHRIS, Columbus International Film Festival
BLUE RIBBON, American Film and Video Festival
BEST DOCUMENTARY, The "Joeys" San Jose Film Festival
SILVER PLAQUE, Chicago Film Festival
BRONZE STAR, Worldfest-Houston International Film Festival
SILVER APPLE, National Educational Film and Video Festival
GOLD MEDAL, Religious Educators Media Award
CHRIS AWARD, Columbus Film Festival
FIRST PRIZE, Whole Life Expo Media Festival/San Francisco
GOLD MEDAL, Virgin Islands/Miami International Film Festival
FIRST PLACE AWARD, Bilbao Film International Film Festival (Spain)

Personal life 
Fadiman's husband is James Fadiman, a published author. They have two children, Renee Fadiman and Maria Fadiman.

References

External links
Dorothy Fadiman's webpage
Dorothy Fadiman's films on the Internet Archive to stream for free
Dorothy Fadiman's/Concentric Media's Papers at the Stanford University Libraries Archive
Filmmaker honored with retrospective  from SFGate November 14, 2003
Gala Kicks off "Dorothy Fadiman Month" Honoring Her Donation of Lifework to Media Center May 14, 2009
Dorothy Fadiman: Inspiring people to action through film and books September 26, 2011 
Choice Shorts The work of Palo Alto documentarian Dorothy Fadiman is celebrated in a local retrospective by Richard Von Busack from MetroActive November 6, 2003
An interview on "CULTURE WARS: The Renewed Attacks on Women's Rights" from Peninsula Peace and Justice Center, March 6, 2012
World peace on the grassroots level from  the Palo Alto Weekly, Oct 18, 2013

American documentary filmmakers
Living people
1939 births
Pennsylvania State University alumni
Stanford University alumni
Film directors from Pennsylvania
American film producers
University of Pittsburgh alumni
American women documentary filmmakers
21st-century American women